Gösta Lilliehöök may refer to:

Gustaf (Gösta) Arvid Lilliehöök (1829–1922), Swedish Army officer, railway builder, canal builder
Gösta Lilliehöök (1871–1952), Swedish Army lieutenant general 
Gustaf Malcolm (Gösta) Lilliehöök (1884–1974), Swedish Army officer and modern pentathlete